Davtak Kertogh (Davtak the Poet) was a 7th-century Armenian poet, the first secular writer in Armenian literature. He is the author of "Elegy on the Death of the Great Prince Jevansher", dedicated to the first Sassanid prince of Caucasian Albania, who accepted Christianity and was murdered.

The only surviving poem by Kertogh is written in alphabetical acrostic verse.

References

External links
 «Плач на смерть великого князя Дживаншира» (Мовсеса Каганкатваци «История страны Агванк» (кн. II, гл.35))

7th-century Armenian poets
Year of birth unknown
Year of death unknown
Armenian male poets